Thomas Michael Curry (born 15 June 1998) is an English rugby union player, currently playing with the Sale Sharks. He plays primarily as a flanker but has also been capped at Number 8 for England.

Club career 
Curry played for Crewe & Nantwich in the early stages of his amateur career where he was coached by his father as well as local cult hero Bobby Walsh.
Curry made his professional debut against Scarlets on 15 October 2016 in the European Champions Cup, becoming the fourth-youngest English player and youngest Sale Sharks player to have played in the competition. He scored on his Premiership Rugby debut on 30 October 2016, becoming the third-youngest scorer in the competition. At the end of the 2016-17 season, he was named a joint recipient of Sale Sharks' Young Player of the Season award, sharing the award with his brother Ben. He captained Sale in their semi-final defeat to Exeter Chiefs in the 2020-21 season, his first playoff appearance for the club.

In the 2021-22 season Curry made 11 appearances for Sale. He started Sale's Champion's Cup quarter final loss to Racing 92. 

In the 2022-23 season Curry scored a try in Sale's second round win over Bath Rugby. He then scored against defending champions Leicester Tigers at Welford Road in round five. Curry scored his first try in the Champions Cup in a 39-0 win against Ulster on 11 December 2022.

International career 
Curry was named in the England U20 squad for the 2016/17 season on 14 October 2016, having previously represented England U18. Curry was part of the England U20 squad that won a Grand Slam in the 2017 Six Nations Under 20 Championship

England national team
Curry was called up to the senior England squad by Eddie Jones for their 2017 summer tour of Argentina. In his first England appearance against the Barbarians on 28 May 2017 he was named Man of the Match. The match against the Barbarians was a 'non-test' fixture, so he did not receive an official cap. Curry made his first capped appearance for England at flanker in the first test against Argentina in June 2017. He became the youngest player to start at flanker for England, and the youngest England forward since 1912.

Curry was named in England's 2019 Six Nations Squad and started at No 7 in all of England's games.  He scored tries in the matches against Wales and Scotland. He started at 6 for the 2019 Rugby World Cup final. With England, Curry has won the Six Nations Championship and the Autumn Nations cup, both in 2020.

Curry was part of the squad for the November 2021 Autumn Nations Series. He was named as a vice captain for the test series, along with fellow squad members Courtney Lawes and Ellis Genge. Curry started the first match of the series, against Tonga, at Number 8. He went on to start both of England's victories over Australia and South Africa.

On 18 January 2022 Curry was named as part of Jones' 36 man squad for the 2022 Six Nations Championship. Curry was named to captain the side from openside flanker in the opening match at Murrayfield, becoming England's youngest captain since 1988. England lost the match 17-20. He also started in England's subsequent victories over Italy and Wales. He suffered a concussion against Wales and exited the game at half time but passed the return to play protocols and was declared fit to start against Ireland. Curry lasted only 14 minutes against Ireland before suffering a hamstring injury which also ruled him out for the final game of the tournament against France. England lost to Ireland and France, finishing the 2022 Six Nations in 3rd place with only two victories.

On 6 June 2022 Curry was named as part of the training squad for England's fixture against the Barbarians and subsequent tour to Australia.  Curry was named as captain for the game against the Barbarians at Twickenham. England were beaten by the Barbarians 52-21, with the Barbarians spending the majority of the match with 14 men. He was named in England's squad for the 2022 England rugby union tour of Australia on 20 June. Curry started the first test match of the tour at openside flanker but suffered a concussion during the match and was replaced at half time. As a result of this he was ruled out of the rest of the test match series, which England would go on to win 2-1.

On 26 September 2022 Curry was named as part of an England squad for a three-day training camp prior to England's end-of-year international fixtures. He started all four of England's test matches at openside flanker, receiving a yellow card in England's final match against South Africa.

Curry suffered a hamstring tear while on club duty with Sale which ruled him out of the first two games of the 2023 Six Nations.

British and Irish Lions
Curry was picked in the 37-man squad for the British & Irish Lions tour to South Africa in the summer of 2021. He made his debut for the Lions in the first of two tour matches against the Cell C Sharks. Three days later Curry appeared off the bench in the second match against the Sharks, scoring his only try of the tour. His last appearance before the test series was in the Lions' first loss of the tour against South Africa 'A'. Curry started all three tests against South Africa at openside flanker, with South Africa going on to win the test series 2-1

International tries

Personal life 
Curry is the twin brother of Sale Sharks flanker Ben Curry, son of Bishop Heber High School Head Teacher David Curry and nephew of former England hooker John Olver and cousin of former Northampton Saints and current Doncaster Knights fly-half Sam Olver. 
John Olver also taught at Oundle School, where Curry was educated for sixth form (age 16-18).

References

1998 births
Living people
British & Irish Lions rugby union players from England
England international rugby union players
English rugby union players
People educated at Oundle School
Rugby union flankers
Rugby union players from Hounslow
Sale Sharks players